Kyogle Council is a local government area in the Northern Rivers region of New South Wales, Australia.

Kyogle Council comprises a large and diverse region with natural attributes, including the Border Ranges National Park and other world heritage listed areas, and cultural features.

The Mayor of Kyogle Council is Clr. Kylie Thomas.

In 2015, Kyogle Council was deemed 'not fit for future' by the New South Wales government's Independent Pricing and Regulatory Tribunal and urged to merge with a nearby council., however the government backflipped later in 2015 and allowed the council to continue in its current form.

Towns and localities

Heritage listings
The Kyogle Council has a number of heritage-listed sites, including:
 High Conservation Value Old Growth forest
 Cougal, 871.00 km Border Loop, North Coast railway: Cougal Spiral

Demographics 
At the 2011 census, there were  people in the Kyogle local government area, of these 50.3 per cent were male and 49.7 per cent were female. Aboriginal and Torres Strait Islander people made up 5.3 per cent of the population, which was significantly higher than the national and state averages of 2.5 per cent. The median age of people in the Kyogle Council area was 45 years, which was significantly higher than the national median of 37 years. Children aged 0 – 14 years made up 19.1 per cent of the population and people aged 65 years and over made up 17.3 per cent of the population. Of people in the area aged 15 years and over, 46.6 per cent were married and 15.1 per cent were either divorced or separated.

When compared with total population growth of Australia for the same periods, being 5.78 per cent and 8.32 per cent respectively, population growth in the Kyogle local government area was significantly lower than the national average. The median weekly income for residents within the Kyogle Council area was significantly lower than the national average.

At the 2011 census, the proportion of residents in the Kyogle local government area who stated their ancestry as Australian or Anglo-Saxon exceeded 85 per cent of all residents (national average was 65.2 per cent). In excess of 23 per cent of all residents in the Kyogle Council at the 2011 census nominated no religious affiliation, compared to the national average of 22.3 per cent. Meanwhile, affiliation with Christianity was 55 per cent, which was slightly higher than the national average of 50.2 per cent. As at the census date, compared to the national average, households in the Kyogle local government area had a significantly lower than average proportion (3.5 per cent) where two or more languages are spoken (national average was 20.4 per cent); and a significantly higher proportion (92.9 per cent) where English only was spoken at home (national average was 76.8 per cent).

References

External links

 
Local government areas of New South Wales